There have been two baronetcies created for persons with the surname Warren, one in the Baronetage of Great Britain and one in the Baronetage of Ireland. As of 2008 one creation is extinct while the other is dormant.

The Warren Baronetcy, of Little Marlow in the County of Buckingham, was created in the Baronetage of Great Britain on 1 June 1775 for the naval commander and politician John Borlase Warren. He was a descendant of Anne, daughter of Sir John Borlase, 1st Baronet (see Borlase baronets), hence his middle name. Warren had no surviving male issue and the title became extinct on his death in 1822.

The Warren Baronetcy, of Warren Court's in the County of Cork, was created in the Baronetage of Ireland on 7 July 1784 for Robert Warren, High Sheriff of County Cork in 1752. The fifth baronet served in the Crimean War and in the Indian Rebellion of 1857 and was High Sheriff of County Cork in 1867. The eighth baronet was a colonel in the Royal Army Service Corps and served as Chief Constable of Buckinghamshire in 1928. The title became dormant on the death of the ninth baronet in 2006.

Five other members of the family may also be mentioned. Thomas Warren, third son of the first baronet, was a member of parliament. His ninth son Brisbane Warren was the father of the Very Reverend Thomas Brisbane Warren, Dean of Cork. Richard Warren, second son of Reverend Robert Warren, eldest son of Reverend Robert Warren, fifth son of the first baronet, was a major-general in the British Army. Augustus Edmund Warren, second son of Richard Benson Warren, Serjeant-at-law, seventh son of the first baronet, was also a major-general in the British Army. Robert Warren, son of Captain Henry Warren, eighth son of the first baronet, was a politician and judge.

Warren baronets, of Little Marlow (1775)

 Sir John Borlase Warren, 1st Baronet (1753–1822)

Warren baronets, of Warren's Court (1784)
 
 Sir Robert Warren, 1st Baronet (1723–1811)
 Sir Augustus Louis Carre Warren, 2nd Baronet (1754–1821)
 Sir Augustus Warren, 3rd Baronet (1791–1863)
 Sir John Borlase Warren, 4th Baronet (1800–1863)
 Sir Augustus Riversdale Warren, 5th Baronet (1833–1914)
 Sir Augustus Riversdale John Blennerhasset Warren, 6th Baronet (1865–1914)
 Sir Augustus George Digby Warren, 7th Baronet (1898–1958)
 Sir Thomas Richard Pennefather Warren, 8th Baronet (1885–1961)
 Sir (Brian) Charles Pennefather Warren, 9th Baronet (1923–2006)
 Sir Philip Digby Somerville-Warren, presumed 10th baronet (born 1948)

The presumed heir of the presumed 10th baronet is his cousin Robert Augustus Michael Mary Warren (born 1948)

The heir apparent of the presumed heir is his eldest son, Dominic Charles Augustus Warren (born 1979)

Notes

References
 Kidd, Charles, Williamson, David (editors). Debrett's Peerage and Baronetage (1990 edition). New York: St Martin's Press, 1990, 
 

Baronetcies in the Baronetage of Ireland
Extinct baronetcies in the Baronetage of Great Britain
1775 establishments in Great Britain
1784 establishments in Ireland